Dupuis is originally a common French surname widespread in northern France, meaning "of / from a (house neighbouring) a well" (du puits).

People with this name
 Alexandre Dupuis (born 1990), Canadian football player
 Albert Dupuis (1877–1967), Belgian composer
 Antony Dupuis (born 1973), French tennis player
 Bob Dupuis (born 1952), Canadian ice hockey player
 Charles-François Dupuis (1742–1809), French scientist
 Debbie Dupuis, Canadian statistician
 George Dupuis, cricketer of the late 18th century
 George Dupuis (cricketer, born 1835) (1835–1912), English schoolmaster, clergyman and cricketer
 Heleen Dupuis (born 1945), Dutch ethicist, professor, and politician
 Jacques Dupuis (politician), Quebec politician
 Jacques Dupuis (priest) (1923–2004), Belgian Jesuit
 Jean Dupuis, founder of Editions Dupuis, Belgian publisher of comics
 Jean Dupuis (1828–1912), French trader and explorer
 José Dupuis (1833–1900), Belgian-born singer of French opéra-bouffe
 Josée Dupuis, Canadian and American biostatistician
 Lori Dupuis (born 1972), female Canadian ice hockey player
 Pascal Dupuis (born 1979), Canadian ice hockey player
 Philippe Dupuis (born 1985), Canadian ice hockey player
 Pierre Dupuis (sometimes spelled Dupuys) (1610–1682), French painter
 Roy Dupuis (born 1963), Quebec actor
 Sadie Dupuis (born 1988), American musician 
 Stephan Dupuis, Makeup artist
 Thomas Sanders Dupuis (1733–1796), English organist and composer
 Toon Dupuis (Antonius Stanislaus Nicolaas Ludovicus Dupuis 1877–1937), Dutch sculptor and medallist
 The Honourable Yvon Dupuis (born 1926), Quebec politician

See also
 Jules Dupuit (1804–1866), French engineer and economist
 Dupuy (surname)
 Dupuie (surname)

References

French-language surnames